Christophe van der Maat (born 29 October 1980) is a Dutch politician of the People's Party for Freedom and Democracy (VVD). From 10 Januari 2022 onwards he is serving as State Secretary for Defence.

Early life and education 
Van der Maat was born on 29 October 1980 in Boxmeer. From 1993 till 2000 he went to the Elzendaalcollege for his HAVO and VWO. From 2000 to 2006 he studied at the University of Tilburg, Dutch law (2000-2002), Public administration (2002-2005) and Master’s in Constitutional Principles of International and European Law (2005-2006).

Political career

Provincial politics 
In 2015 and 2019 van der Maat was a member of the provincial council of North Brabant. Being the lead candidate from the VVD in North Brabant during the 2019 Dutch provincial elections. From 2015 till 2022 he was also a member of the North Brabant provincial executive, with responsibility for mobility, provincial organisation, knowledge institutions and cooperation (2015-2019) and for mobility, finance and provincial organisation and First Deputy King’s Commissioner (2019-2022).

State Secretary of Defence, 2022–present 
On 10 January 2022 van der Maat was appointed State Secretary for Defence in the fourth Rutte cabinet.

Personal life 
Van der Maat is married and has one child.

References

External links 

1980 births
Living people
People's Party for Freedom and Democracy politicians
State Secretaries for Defence of the Netherlands
21st-century Dutch civil servants
21st-century Dutch politicians